Acaena emittens is a species of perennial plant limited to scrubland and forest clearings at an altitude of 450–1500 m in central North Island, New Zealand.

This plant has slender dark brown branches, growing prostrately, up to 50 cm in length. Each branch ends in three distinctively rounded green leaflets which are hairy but not glaucous as in many of its congeners. This species is usually found within clearings in open forests of Nothofagus and in scrubland dominated by Leptospermum scoparium. Flowering occurs from December to February with fruit being produced from January onwards.

References

emittens
Flora of New Zealand
Plants described in 1989